A code duello is a set of rules for a one-on-one combat, or duel. Codes duello regulate dueling and thus help prevent vendettas between families and other social factions.  They ensure that non-violent means of reaching agreement be exhausted and that harm be reduced, both by limiting the terms of engagement and by providing medical care.  Finally, they ensure that the proceedings have a number of witnesses.  The witnesses could assure grieving members of factions of the fairness of the duel, and could help provide testimony if legal authorities become involved.

From the Roman Empire to Middle Ages
In Rome, the most famous duel was fought between three Horatii brothers and three Curiatii brothers, respecting precise rules during the 7th century BC. Marc Antony and Octavian also challenged each other to a duel which never came to fruition. The Lombards had dueling rituals too, often controlled by local judges. The Norse sagas give accounts of the rules of dueling in the Viking Age holmganga. The 1409 Flos Duellatorum of Italy is the earliest example of an actual code duello in Europe. Fechtbücher of Hans Talhoffer and other fifteenth century masters give rules for judicial duels and "tournament rules" with varying degrees of detail.

From the Renaissance to the 19th century
A morally acceptable duel would start with the challenger issuing a traditional, public, personal grievance, based on an insult, directly to the single person who offended the challenger.

The challenged person had the choice of a public apology or other restitution, or choosing the weapons for the duel.  The challenger would then propose a place for the "field of honor". The challenged person had to either accept the site or propose an alternative.  The location had to be a place where the opponents could duel without being arrested.  It was common for the constables to set aside such places and times and spread the information, so that bystanders could avoid the location and stay out of harm's way. 

At the field of honor, each side would bring a doctor and seconds.  The seconds would try to reconcile the parties by acting as go-betweens to attempt to settle the dispute with an apology or restitution.  If reconciliation succeeded, all parties considered the dispute to be honorably settled, and went home.

Each side would have at least one second; three was the traditional number.

If one party failed to appear, they were considered to be a coward and the appearing party would win by default.  The seconds (and sometimes the doctor) would bear witness to the cowardice. The resulting reputation for cowardice would often considerably affect the individual's standing in society, perhaps even extending to their family also.

The sword, with or without a companion weapon, was the customary dueling weapon until around 1800, by which time the custom of wearing the sword in civilian life had largely died out and the pistol had taken its pride of place in both dueling and self-defense. Nevertheless, sword duels continued until the extinction of dueling itself.

When using swords, the two parties would start on opposite sides of a square twenty paces wide.  Usually the square was marked at the corners with dropped handkerchiefs.  Leaving the square was accounted cowardice.

The opponents agreed to duel to an agreed condition.  While many modern accounts dwell heavily on "first blood" as the condition, manuals of honour from the day universally deride the practice as dishonorable and unmanly. Far more common was a duel until either one party was physically unable to fight or the physician called a halt.  While explicit or sustained duels "to the death" were rare, many duels nonetheless resulted in the death of one or both combatants because of the wounds sustained and the limited capacities of doctors of the time to treat such wounds effectively; it was not uncommon for wounded participants to succumb to infection later.

When the condition was achieved, the matter was considered settled with the winner proving their point and the loser keeping their reputation for courage.

Irish Code Duello
Dueling with firearms grew in popularity in the 18th century, especially with the adoption of the Irish Code Duello in 1777 at the Clonmel Summer Assizes. The Code consists of 25 rules and several footnotes. Rule 16 gives the choice of weapons to the challenged party, but the use of swords can be avoided if the challenger swears on his honor not to be a swordsman, making it easier and more practical to duel.

Typical weapons were cased dueling pistols, tuned for identical appearance, reliability and accuracy.  In America, the Irish code eventually supplanted the usual method of brutal hand-to-hand combat and gave the combat a respectable feel.  However, since the combatants could not control guns as precisely as swords, gun duels had a greater chance of being fatal. Some duels miscarried because both opponents did not hear or see the starting signal.  Agreeing to a signal was helpful.

The Irish code banned the custom of deloping, or deliberately discharging one's firearm into the ground (usually well away from the opponent). This custom was used when one or both duellists wished to end a dispute without inflicting bodily harm or appearing cowardly; the Irish code forbade the practice because it often resulted in accidental injury.

In 1838 former governor of South Carolina John Lyde Wilson published The Code of Honor; or Rules for the Government of Principals and Seconds in Dueling. The author later stated that at the time of writing, he had never seen the Irish code.

Marquess of Queensberry
Just a few years after it was promulgated, many people wrote rather forcefully that the Irish Code was far too deadly for the necessary business of discovering social positions among the military gentry. Those objecting to the Code Duello included Benjamin Franklin and Queen Victoria in whose day and realm the duel was already nearly extinct.

Pugilism had been growing in popularity and technique in Venice since 12th century, and in England since 1615, when a London armsmaster began offering public lessons in fisticuffs to the gentry. After many years, and several attempts by other men to write acceptable rules, John Graham Chambers wrote the Marquess of Queensberry rules in 1865. They were published in 1867.

He intended them solely for amateur matches, a thinly veiled reference to bouts of fisticuffs between gentlemen. The authorities began to allow prize matches and amateur boxing under this new rule system when John Sholto Douglas, 9th Marquess of Queensberry endorsed its use.

The new rules had a three-minute limit on rounds, required gloves, and forbade grappling and wrestling. The rules prevented permanent mutilation: They did not permit punches to the temples, neck or below the belt. They also forbade kicking, biting and eye gouging.

The result was a viscerally satisfying fight with far less actual hazard than either a sword or gunfight. In other words, it became a nearly perfect vehicle for addressing matters of pride and insult.

As a practical matter, the legal sport of pugilism replaced dueling for most English gentlemen near this time. Only the involved gentlemen ever needed to know the points of honor at stake.

Dueling thereby moved underground and to 'sport' and has stayed there.

Southern US code of honor

Southern duels persisted through the 1840s even after dueling in the United States was outlawed. Commonly held on sand bars in rivers where jurisdiction was unclear, they were rarely prosecuted. States such as South Carolina, Tennessee, Texas, Louisiana, and others had their own dueling customs and traditions. Most duels occurred between adult members of the upper classes, but teenage duels and those in the middle-classes also existed. Duels offered the promise of esteem and status, and they also served as a form of scapegoating for unresolved personal problems.

Western US code duello
The stereotypical quick draw duel seen in many Western films were, in part, from the traditional code duello of the South brought by Southern emigrants. Duels in the Old West were fought for personal honor, though the quick-draw duels of popular legend were rare. Typical Western duels were a crude form of Southern code duello; they were highly formalized means of solving disputes between gentlemen, with swords or guns, that had their origins in European chivalry. The first known quick-draw duel was conducted by a Southern man named Davis Tutt against Wild Bill Hickok on July 21, 1865. Other more formal duels, like those typical in Europe, were also fought, like the Anderson–McCluskie duel.

See also
 Trial by combat
 Burr–Hamilton duel

References

Sources
"The Duel: A History of Duelling". Robert Baldick, Chapman and Hall Ltd., London, 1965; Hamlyn Publishing Group Ltd., London, 1970. .
" A Polite Exchange of Bullets; The Duel and the English Gentleman, 1750-1850". Dr Stephen Banks, Boydell and Brewer, London, 2010.
"Dead before Breakfast: The English Gentleman and Honour Affronted", Dr Stephen Banks in Sheila Bibb and Daniel Escandell (eds), Best Served Cold: Studies on Revenge. Oxford: Inter-Disciplinary Press, 2010.
"Pistols at dawn – the Irish origins of the gentleman's duel"
"Challengers Chastised and Duellists Deterred: Kings Bench and Criminal Informations, 1800-1820" (PDF). Stephen Banks (2007). Australia & New Zealand Law & History E-Journal. Refereed Paper No (4).
"Killing with Courtesy: The English Duelist, 1785-1845". S. Banks (2008). 47. Journal of British Studies: 528-558.
Founding Brothers: The Revolutionary Generation, Ellis J., Joseph, Vintage Books Inc., New York, 2002. .

External links
Code Duello Pages
Commentary on the 26 Rules
John Lyde Wilson's Code of Honor
The 26 Rules of the Irish Clonmel Code Duello
The Code of Honor, Or, Rules for the Government of Principals and Seconds in Duelling
Down the river, or Practical Lessons Under the Code Duello - Based in the American South, a humorous story of the Code in action.

Dueling
Warrior code